This is the comprehensive discography of Stratovarius, a power metal band from Finland.

Albums

Studio albums

Compilation albums

Live albums

DVD

EPs
"Future Shock" (1988)
"Black Night" (1989)
"Break The Ice" (1991)
"Wings Of Tomorrow" (1994)
"Father Time" (1996)
"Will The Sun Rise?" (1996)
"Black Diamond" (1997)
"The Kiss Of Judas" (1997)
"S.O.S." (1998)
"Hunting High And Low" (2000)
"It's a Mystery" (2000)
"A Million Light Years Away" (2000)
"Eagleheart" (2002)
"I Walk To My Own Song" (2003)
"Maniac Dance" (2005)
"Deep Unknown" (2009)
"Darkest Hours" (2010)
"Unbreakable" (2013)
"Unbreakable" (Orchestral Version) (2018)
"Enigma / Act II" (2018)

Music videos
 "Future Shock" (1988) 
 "Break The Ice" (live) (1992)
 "Against The Wind" (First version) (1995) 
 "Against The Wind" (Second version) (1995) 
 "Distant Skies" (live) (1995)
 "Speed Of Light" (1996) 
 "Black Diamond" (1997) 
 "The Kiss Of Judas" (1997) 
 "Hold On To Your Dream" (Unplugged) (1998)
 "S. O. S." (1998) 
 "S. O .S." (live) (1999) 
 "Hunting High And Low" (2000) 
 "A Million Light Years Away" (2000) 
 "Freedom" (2000)
 "Speed Of Light" (live) (2001)
 "Forever Free" (live) (2001)
 "Eagleheart" (2003) 
 "I Walk To My Own Song" (2003) 
 "Maniac Dance" (2005) 
 "Deep Unknown" (2009) 
 "Under Flaming Skies" (2011) 
 "Black Diamond" (live) (2012) 
 "Halcyon Days" (2013)
 "Unbreakable" (2013) 
 "If The Story Is Over" (2014) 
 "Shine In The Dark" (lyric video) (2015) 
 "My Eternal Dream" (2015) 
 "Shine In The Dark" (2015) 
 "Until The End Of Days" (2016) 
 "My Eternal Dream" (live) (2017) 
 "Unbreakable (Orchestral Version)" (lyric video) (2018) 
 "Survive" (lyric video) (2022) 
 "World On Fire" (2022) 
 "Firefly" (2022) 
 "Broken" (2022) 
 "Survive" (2022)

References

External links
 

Discographies of Finnish artists
Heavy metal group discographies